Eschiva of Ibelin may refer to:

 Eschiva of Ibelin (died 1196), queen-consort of Cyprus
 Eschiva of Ibelin (died 1312), lady of Beirut
 Eschiva of Ibelin, daughter of Guy of Ibelin, constable of Cyprus

House of Ibelin